U.S. Route 29 (US 29) is a  north–south United States highway that travels from the Savannah River to Blacksburg, entirely in Upstate South Carolina.

Route description
From there, it goes on a northeasterly direction towards Anderson.   outside Anderson, US 29 Business takes a left turn and more direct route into the downtown area; while mainline US 29 continues east, with most signage signed "TRUCK" instead of the more usual "BY-PASS" (state maps confirm it is the mainline route). At SC 81, US 29 takes a left turn and follows briefly before taking a right turn at Shockley Ferry Road. Crossing SC 28 Business, the road widens to an undivided four-lane, continuing until reaching River Street (US 76/US 178); where US 29 makes another right turn and then soon left again. US 29 meets back with US 29 Business at Williamston Road. Continuing northeast for another , US 29 makes a junction with US 29/SC 20 Connector to Williamston; the highway briefly divides at junction. With another , US 29 merges with northbound Interstate 85 (exit 34, northbound exit and southbound entrance only).

After traveling in concurrency with Interstate 85, US 29 switches onto Interstate 185 at exit 42 (exit 14B on Interstate 185).  After , Interstate 185 ends at Henrydale Avenue; US 29 continues along Mills Avenue, followed by Church Street (staying straight), through downtown Greenville.  At North Street and Academy Street (US 123), travelers can connect to Interstate 385; between the two streets is the Bon Secours Wellness Arena.  Church street eventually ends onto Wade Hampton Boulevard, which is a divided six-lane highway from Greenville to Greer.

Once after passing through Greer, the highway shrinks to a divided four-lane highway, continuing through Lyman and Wellford.  After passing Interstate 85 (exit 66) and Interstate 26 (exit 21), US 29 enters Spartanburg and through one of the busiest commercial areas in the city, centered at Westgate Mall (the highway is widen to six-lanes throughout the commercial area).  As US 29 enters the city center area, it takes a left onto Saint John Street, then proceeds to parallel Main Street before rejoining  later.  At Pine Street (US 176/SC 9), travelers can connect to Interstate 585.  US 29 continues in a northeasterly direction into Cowpens, where the highway reduces down to a two-lane through town.

After passing through Cowpens, the road widens again to an undivided 4-lane for  before entering into Gaffney.  Continuing as a two-lane road through both Gaffney and Blacksburg, it crosses one last time with Interstate 85 (exit 106), before entering North Carolina.

History
From its inception until 1959, US 29 was the main thoroughfare in Upstate South Carolina and connecting regionally with Atlanta and Charlotte.  Though still important in the upstate, it now takes a traveler on a more indirect route compared to Interstate 85.

Established in 1927 as an original U.S. Route, it generally traversed the same today as it then when created; from Georgia to North Carolina, via Anderson, Greenville, Greer, Spartanburg, Gaffney, and Blacksburg.  The entire route was in concurrency with SC 8.

In 1928, SC 8 was rerouted completely off US 29.  In 1935, US 29 was rerouted onto new alignment between Anderson and Greenville.  The old routing using Greenville Road onto Old Anderson Road, then east on Pendleton Road and finally Main Street was renumbered as SC 81.  The new routing turns at Williamson Road, to Williamston, Pelzer, and Piedmont, before entering Greenville on Grove Road, Allen Street, Pendleton Street, and finally Main Street.  The new alignment replaced SC 248 and part of SC 20.

In 1938, US 29 was rerouted from Greenville northward.  From using Main Street, to Buncombe Road, to Rutherford Avenue, and to Camp Road into Greer.  The new routing follows Main Street to Stone Avenue and finally to Wade Hampton Boulevard.

Between 1943-1946, US 29 was moved onto new road bypassing Greer and Duncan.  In 1947, US 29 was given a southeastern bypass of Anderson, creating a business loop through downtown.  In 1948, US 29 was rerouted onto Grove Road and Augusta Road, leaving Allen Street and Green Street, in Greenville.

By 1955, US 29 was rerouted onto a new Super two highway north of Spartanburg, Cowpens, Gaffney, and Blacksburg; the old route became US 29 Alternate. In 1957 or 1958, US 29 was rerouted onto a new Super two highway, bypassing Williamston, Pelzer, and Piedmont; the old alignment later became connector route for US 29/SC 20.  It then went onto new road connecting with US 25 and SC 291.  In concurrency with SC 291, it reaches Wade Hampton Boulevard; leaving behind a business loop through downtown Greenville.  In 1959, Interstate 85 was assigned from Spartanburg to North Carolina, in concurrency with US 29, once the highway was expanded into four-lanes.

In 1962, US 29 was removed from Interstate 85 from Spartanburg to North Carolina and was moved back on its original routing, replacing US 29 Alternate.  In the Greenville area, US 29 was rerouted back through Greenville along Interstate 185, which connected directly via Church Street, to Wade Hampton Boulevard.  US 29 Business in Greenville was decommissioned as a result.  The old alignment to SC 291 became part of Interstate 85.  Finally, at the South Carolina-Georgia state line, US 29 was rerouted south from SC 412 to avoid the new Lake Hartwell.  Most of old US 29 is underwater, with parts of it above surface used for marina purposes.

In 1974, US 29 was rerouted onto Saint Johns Avenue from Main Street, in Spartanburg.

Major intersections

See also

Special routes of U.S. Route 29

References

External links

US 29 at Virginia Highways' South Carolina Highways Annex

29
 South Carolina
Transportation in Anderson County, South Carolina
Transportation in Greenville County, South Carolina
Transportation in Spartanburg County, South Carolina
Transportation in Cherokee County, South Carolina
Anderson, South Carolina
Easley, South Carolina
Transportation in Greenville, South Carolina
Greer, South Carolina
Spartanburg, South Carolina
Gaffney, South Carolina